The Mashonaland cricket team was a first-class cricket team representing the Mashonaland province in Zimbabwe. They competed in the Logan Cup from 1994 until the format was revamped in 2007. James Kirtley played for Mashonaland during the 1996/1997 season. Andy Flower played for Mashonaland in 1994, 1995 and 2003.

The club played most of its home games at the Harare Sports Club ground.

Honours
 Logan Cup (9) -  
1994–95, 1996–97, 1997–98, 1999–2000, 2000–01, 2001–02, 2002–03, 2003–04, 2004–05

References 
 Wisden Cricketers Almanack (annual)

External links
 History of Logan Cup 
 Domestic records

History of Zimbabwean cricket
Former Zimbabwean first-class cricket teams
Cricket teams in Zimbabwe
Former senior cricket clubs in Zimbabwe
Cricket in Mashonaland